The Remainderer is an EP by the Fall, released on 9 November 2013. It features five new songs by the group and a medley of two Gene Vincent covers, "Say Mama" and "Race With the Devil". The title track was previously played live. Curiously, "Race with the Devil" is not a new recording, but a live performance recorded at the John Peel 50th-anniversary concert back in 1989 with the Extricate lineup; this recording had previously appeared on The Fall Red Box Set 1976-2007. The last song, "Touchy Pad" features Tamsin Middleton of Manchester band Mr Heart on vocals. The release was explained as a bridging point by the record company. The vinyl version features earlier mixes that differ from the CD. The release was followed by a number of live-shows.

Critical reaction 

The Remainderer was positively received, receiving an 73/100 score at Metacritic.com.

The Quietus described the title track as "full of mischief and malevolence" and the rest of the EP as "answering the call of the weird". Pitchfork noted the longevity of the line-up as "an encouraging sign that stability has yet to ossify into stagnation with this ongoing iteration of the band, who formidably exercise their elasticity over the course of these six wildly divergent tracks". The Line of Best Fit commented that the EP "isn’t necessarily consistently solid, but it’s decidedly close. Fundamentally though it’s reaffirmation of their aptitude for quantity and quality". NME found the EP to "sound like someone’s brought Elvis back to life".

Track listing

Personnel
The Fall
 Mark E. Smith – vocals, production
 Elena Poulou – keyboards
 Peter Greenway – guitar
 Dave Spurr – bass 
 Keiron Melling – drums

Additional personnel
 Daren Garratt – drums on "The Remainderer", "Amorator!", "Mister Rode" and "Say Mama" (uncredited)
 Simon "Ding" Archer – production, voice on " R"
 Tamsin Middleton – vocals on "Touchy Pad"
 Martin Bramah – guitar on "Race With The Devil" (uncredited)
 Craig Scanlon – guitar on "Race With The Devil" (uncredited)
 Steve Hanley – bass on "Race With The Devil" (uncredited)
 Marcia Schofield – keyboards on "Race With The Devil" (uncredited)
 Simon Wolstencroft – drums on "Race With The Devil" (uncredited)

References

2013 EPs
The Fall (band) EPs